Freeman House, also known as The Hertford Academy, is a historic school building located in the Murfreesboro Historic District at Murfreesboro, Hertford County, North Carolina.  It was built about 1810, and is a two-story, Federal style brick building with a hip roof and central passage plan.  It is considered the birthplace of Chowan University.

It was listed on the National Register of Historic Places in 1971.

Gallery

References

Historic American Buildings Survey in North Carolina
School buildings on the National Register of Historic Places in North Carolina
Federal architecture in North Carolina
School buildings completed in 1810
Buildings and structures in Murfreesboro, North Carolina
National Register of Historic Places in Hertford County, North Carolina
Historic district contributing properties in North Carolina